Boris Savelev (born 1948) is a Ukrainian-born Russian photographer.

Career
His original career was as an aerospace engineer, however it is photography that made his name since 1976. His works have been shown in galleries in his home country as well as United States, Germany and the UK. In the 1980s, Savelev experimented on color photographies. His first published work was The Secret City (1988), color photographs taken using Orwachrome film. The photographs capture Russia during a period of great upheaval, from the Cold War, through the dissolution of the U.S.S.R., to modern-day Russia.

His style has been described as observational realism preoccupied with light and form. Savelev himself credits his 'methodical, scientific background' for the constructivist aesthetic in his photos.

Exhibitions (recent)
 2014 - Boris Savelav, Michael Hoppen Gallery, London

Collections
 Museum of Contemporary Photography, Columbia College Chicago, Chicago, Illinois
 Art Institute of Chicago, Chicago, Illinois

Publications
 Secret City, Photographs from the USSR, Boris Savelev. London: Thames & Hudson, 1988.
 Über die großen Städte (Catalog). Berlin: NGBK, 1993.
 Another Russia, Daniela Mrazkova and Vladimir Remes. New York: Facts on File, 1986.
 Changing Reality. Leah Bendavid-Val, Washington, D.C.: Starwood Publishing, 1991.
 Elena Darikovich and Boris Savelev: Photography. State Museum Art Gallery, Kaliningrad, 1994.
 Say Cheese. (Catalog), Le Comptoir de la Photographie," Paris, 1988.

References

External links
 
 Boris Savelev Anahita Photo Archive 
 Boris Savelev at Michael Hoppen Gallery: Review by Francis Kavanagh for Artists Insight 
 Boris Savelev at the Galerie m Bochum

Soviet photographers
Russian photographers
Moscow Aviation Institute alumni
Living people
Street photographers
Year of birth missing (living people)